Zafer Kılıçkan (born February 22, 1973 in Gölcük) is a former Turkish football midfielder who last played for USL First Division side Minnesota Thunder.

Club career
Kılıçkan played for several clubs in the lower divisions of Turkish football, including Pendikspor and Boluspor. In 2002, Kılıçkan signed with the Minnesota Thunder of the USL First Division, playing with the team through the 2006 season.

Career as manager
He is currently the Assistant Coach of Women's Soccer team at Augsburg University.  He is also the Director of Camps for the Minneapolis United Soccer. Zafer also teaching PowerYoga - Vinyasa during the winter season at  UnitedClubs, Lotus  and Yoga Rooms in Istanbul.

References

1973 births
Living people
Turkish footballers
USL First Division players
Minnesota Thunder players
Boluspor footballers
Pendikspor footballers
Anadolu Üsküdar 1908 footballers
A-League (1995–2004) players

Association football midfielders
People from Kocaeli Province